Päijänne National Park is a national park in Finland, in the southern parts of Lake Päijänne. It consists of 50 unbuilt islands and parts of inhabited islands.

See also 
 List of national parks of Finland
 Protected areas of Finland

References

External links
 Outdoors.fi – Päijänne National Park

Lake Päijänne
Protected areas established in 1993
Geography of Päijät-Häme
Tourist attractions in Päijät-Häme
Sysmä
1993 establishments in Finland
National parks of Finland